Pipaliya Dhakad is a village in the Bhopal district of Madhya Pradesh, India. It is located in the Huzur tehsil and the Phanda block.

The road connecting this village to Sehore road was the first road constructed using plastic waste in Madhya Pradesh.

Demographics 

According to the 2011 census of India, Pipaliya Dhakad has 183 households. The effective literacy rate (i.e. the literacy rate of population excluding children aged 6 and below) is 72.99%.

References 

Villages in Huzur tehsil